The name HMNZS Tui may apply to:

 , a minesweeper commissioned 1941–1967
 , an oceanographic research ship commissioned 1970–1998

Royal New Zealand Navy ship names